Phase 4 Stereo was a recording process created by the U.K. Decca Records label in 1961.  The process was used on U.K. Decca recordings and also those of its American subsidiary London Records during the 1960s.

Phase 4 Stereo recordings were created with an innovative 10-channel, and later 20-channel, "recording console" (actually a mixing console.

Those 10-channel and 20-channel console outputs for Phase 4 recordings were originally made on then-novel 4-track tape, but the innovation was in the special scoring used to maximize the technology. Normally in recording techniques of the early-to-mid-60s, to get the kind of layered sound realized in Phase 4 recordings, required multiple overdubs over multiple reels of tape, bouncing down and bouncing across to different recorders. This increased the level of tape hiss on the final master, something which Phase 4 engineers could not tolerate. So they achieved in their scoring techniques what could be recorded in one pass what everybody else was achieving with multiple overdubs.

The concept of Phase 4 Stereo has no connection with Quadraphonic sound or "four channel stereo." But because there often are sounds in the extreme right or extreme left channels, the records may also give pleasing results when played on Hafler circuit systems or other simulated four channel systems.

Approximately two hundred albums were released with the process, including popular music, "gimmick" records engineered to make the sound travel from speaker to speaker, records featuring percussion effects, and historical sound effect records. In 1964, a light classical Phase 4 "Concert Series" was produced.

In 1996 a CD, The Phase 4 Experience, was released with classical and soundtrack recordings from 1966 to 1979 (London 444 788-2 LPX/PY 871).  In 2014, a 41-CD boxed set of Stereo Concert Series classical albums was released, and in 2017 another 40-CD box set of soundtrack and Easy listening/popular recordings, called Spectacular: Nice 'n' Easy.

A space themed version, An Astromusical Odyssey, was arranged by Johnny Keating which included songs from the late 1960s to the early 1970s. A selection can be heard on YouTube.

History and development 
By the end of the 1940s Decca had consolidated a remarkable prestige among music lovers in the field of high-fidelity music recording through its ffrr (full frequency range recording) series. These recordings took advantage of the technological advances developed by the firm during World War II at the request of the Royal Navy.

In the hands of innovative sound engineers like Kenneth Wilkinson, the recordings of the Decca-London stood out for their wide frequency response and good resolution.

The ffrr series was continued at the end of the following decade by another in stereo sound called ffss (full frequency stereo sound), equally appreciated for its quality. The sound shots were obtained by three omnidirectional microphones suspended at 1.5 meters over the orchestral group (Decca tree).

Although the specialized music lover enthusiastically welcomed stereophonic recordings for their ability to reproduce the music in an analogous way as it would be heard in a concert hall, the system in principle did not have a good response at popular level. This was mainly due to the high cost of reproduction equipment that did not correspond to appreciable advantages by potential buyers.

In the early 1960s, strong competition began among the various record companies in an attempt to introduce the system to the non-specialized client.

The emphasis was then placed not on achieving a realistic reproduction of the sound, but rather on dazzling the listener with effects and sound acrobatics that the stereo allowed to achieve artificially at the mixing tables (gimmick).

Phase 4 Stereo was the label of Decca-London to compete in this segment. The title referred to a series of stages or phases that the stereo would have previously gone through. The recordings, which benefited from the previous technological advances of the firm, were processed in a ten-channel console, although later one of twenty was used. Then the mixture was recorded on four-track tape, then masterized to two channels and turned to stereophonic vinyl records.

The sound engineer, in close collaboration with orchestra directors and arrangers, controlled the volume of certain musical instruments or orchestral groups to enhance their presence in the recording, or caused them to move between the left and right channels. It was also processed  with effects including electronic reverberation and microphone offset, all of which had to be done live to get the desired effect. 

Huge amounts of session outtakes exist which appear to be perfectly fine to the casual stereo listener, but when the master take is confirmed against the outtake, it's obvious if a pan cue was missed or a processing element was omitted. Many of the sound engineer development people had worked in a similar capacity with Stokowski on Fantasia over twenty years earlier and many of the younger assistant engineers would go on to perform similar scoring and engineering duties for what would later become Dolby Surround.

The sound engineers Arthur Lilley and Arthur Bannister made most of the series' recordings, but was Bannister who used sound manipulation with more exaggeration. During the initial stage, some artists of the Decca's easy listening catalogs participated in the series, like Eric Rogers, Ted Heath, Werner Müller, Ronnie Aldrich, Edmundo Ros or Stanley Black. The series was successful in sales and a total of about 300 long play albums were published.

In 1964 Decca-London  decided to include within the label a series with works of classical music known and accepted by the general public (Concert Series). The task initially fell to the easy listening director, Stanley Black. These recordings were not well received by the specialized critic who described them as having an unnatural sound and the director's approach being superficial.

However, the famous Leopold Stokowski, always aligned with the popularization of the great classics, had no objection in making several recordings for Phase 4 Stereo Concert Series, a way followed by other directors of established fame such as Antal Dorati, Erich Leinsdorf, Anatole Fistoulari, Charles Munch, Lorin Maazel or Bernard Herrmann. It is fair to recognize, however, that in these cases, the sound, although not exempt from exaggerated brightness, was not so artificial.

In the series of classical composers almost 200 albums were released. At the same time Decca continued recording classical music and popular music with traditional criteria.

The series was phased out in 1979, and almost all Phase 4 Stereo LPs were reissued on compact discs, including the classical music series.

See also
List of record labels

References

External links
 History of Phase 4 Stereo

British record labels
Audiophile record labels
Record labels established in 1961
Decca Records
London Records